Water polo at the 2011 Pan American Games was held from October 23 to October 29, 2011, at the Scotiabank Aquatics Center in Guadalajara, Mexico. Each men's and women's team consisted of 13 athletes. Therefore, a total of 208 athletes competed in water polo at these games. The winner of each tournament (the United States) qualified to compete at the 2012 Summer Olympics in London, Great Britain, while the second through fourth-place finishers in each tournament qualified for the last chance qualifying tournament.

Medal summary

Medal table

Events

Men

The following nations qualified for the men's tournament:

Women

The following nations qualified for the women's tournament:

Schedule
The competition will be spread out across seven days.

References

 
Events at the 2011 Pan American Games
2011
2011 in water polo
2011